Hypospila brunnescens is a species of moth in the family Erebidae. It is found in Indonesia (Sulawesi, Java).

Subspecies
Hypospila brunnescens brunnescens (Sulawesi)
Hypospila brunnescens javanica Roepke 1938 (Java)

References

Moths described in 1938
Hypospila